Duncan Campbell (1680?-1730) was a Scottish deaf man and professed soothsayer.

Life
The account of Campbell's early life, brought up in Lapland where his Scottish father had wed a local woman, has been questioned. He had some teaching at the University of Glasgow, according to the recommendations of John Wallis.

Campbell went in 1694 to London, where his predictions attracted attention in fashionable society. Running into debt, he went to Rotterdam, where he enlisted as a soldier. Returning in a few years to London, he read a wealthy young widow's fortune, to his own benefit, and having taken a house in Monmouth Street, he found himself again a centre of attraction.

Campbell succeeded in obtaining the notice of royalty, as reporting in the 'Daily Post' of Wednesday, 4 May 1720: 'Last Monday Mr. Campbell, the deaf and dumb gentleman—introduced by Colonel Carr—kissed the king's hand, and presented to his majesty "The History of his Life and Adventures", which was by his majesty most graciously received.'

In 1726 Campbell appeared as a vendor of miraculous medicines. He published 'The Friendly Demon; It consists of two letters, the first by Duncan Campbell, giving an account of an illness which attacked him in 1717, and continued nearly eight years, until his good genius appeared and revealed that he could be cured by the use of the lodestone; the second on genii or familiar spirits, with an account of a marvellous sympathetic powder which had been brought from the East. A postscript informed the readers that at 'Dr. Campbell's house, in Buckingham Court, over against Old Man's Coffee House, at Charing Cross, they may be readily furnished with his "Pulvis Miraculosus", and finest sort of Egyptian loadstones.'

Campbell died after a severe illness in 1730.

Literary references
'All his visitants,’ says a writer in The Tatler No. 14, 'come to him full of expectations, and pay his own rate for the interpretations they put upon his shrugs and nods;’ and he is referred to in The Spectator No. 560: 'Every one has heard of the famous conjuror who, according to the opinion of the vulgar, has studied himself dumb. Be that as it will, the blind Tiresias was not more famous in Greece than this dumb artist has been for some years last past in the cities of London and Westminster.'

Edmund Curll in 1720 published The History of the Life and Adventures of Mr. Duncan Campbell. It was probably written by William Bond; the traditional attribution to Daniel Defoe is now considered implausible.

On 18 June 1720 there appeared a pamphlet entitled Mr. Campbell's Pacquet.‘ This was edited by Bond; the third section of the pamphlet was written by Defoe (DNB). In 1724 there was published A Spy upon the Conjuror. This pamphlet was by Eliza Haywood. About a third of the pamphlet consists of letters— generally very amusing, sometimes of the most extraordinary character—written by Campbell's correspondents. The 1725 'The Dumb Projector; being a surprising account of a Trip to Holland made by Mr. Campbell, with the manner of his Reception and Behaviour there,’ was also by Haywood.

An account of his life appeared in 1732, under the title 'Secret Memoirs of the late Mr. Duncan Campbell, the famous Deaf and Dumb Gentleman, written by himself, who ordered they should be published after his decease. To which is added an application by way of vindication of Mr. Duncan Campbell against the groundless aspersion cast upon him that he had pretended to be Deaf and Dumb.'

References

Attribution

1680 births
1730 deaths
People from Argyll and Bute
17th-century Scottish people
18th-century Scottish people
17th-century Finnish people
18th-century Finnish people
Divination
17th-century occultists
18th-century occultists
People from Lapland (Finland)
Scottish deaf people